NADH:ubiquinone oxidoreductase complex assembly factor 6 is a protein that in humans is encoded by the NDUFAF6 gene. The protein is involved in the assembly of complex I in the mitochondrial electron transport chain. Mutations in the NDUFAF6 gene have been shown to cause Complex I deficiency, Leigh syndrome, and Acadian variant Fanconi Syndrome.

Structure 
The NDUFAF6 gene is located on the q arm of chromosome 8 in position 22.1 and spans 222,728 base pairs. The gene produces a 38.2 kDa protein composed of 333 amino acids. The protein contains a predicted phytoene synthase domain.

Function 
The NDUFAF6 gene encodes a protein that localizes to mitochondria. The encoded protein plays an important role in the assembly of complex I (NADH-ubiquinone oxidoreductase) of the mitochondrial respiratory chain through regulation of subunit ND1 biogenesis.

Clinical Significance 
Mutations in the NDUFAF6 gene are associated with complex I enzymatic deficiency and lead to Leigh syndrome, which is characterized by lesions in the central nervous system and rapid deterioration of cognitive and motor functions. In Acadians, a non-coding mutation in NDUFAF6 has been shown to cause Acadian variant Fanconi Syndrome, symptoms of which include pulmonary interstitial fibrosis and proximal tubular dysfunction accompanied by slowly progressive kidney disease. Inheritance of mutations in the NDUFAF6 gene is autosomal recessive.

Interactions 
The protein encoded by NDUFAF6 interacts with RHOXF2, OTX1, GUCD1, and GALNT6 proteins.

References

Further reading 

Peripheral membrane proteins
Cellular respiration